Vị Thanh is a provincial city and also the capital city of Hậu Giang Province in Vietnam. Formerly, it was the capital town of Chương-Thiện province in South Vietnam. In 2004, Vị Thanh became the capital of Hậu Giang Province. It has an industrial zone of 880,000 square metres (217 acres). There are roads, National Highway 61 (which leads to National Road 1 which leads to Cần Thơ Municipality on the Hậu River which leads to Ho Chi Minh City), and water connections by canal and river to the Hậu River.

Vị Thanh is the second biggest city of Hậu Giang, after Ngã Bảy became a city in 2020.

Populated places in Hậu Giang province
Districts of Hậu Giang province
Provincial capitals in Vietnam
Cities in Vietnam